The Great Central Railway Class 9N, classified A5 by the LNER, was a class of 4-6-2 tank locomotives designed by John G. Robinson for suburban passenger services.  They were fitted with superheaters, piston valves and Stephenson valve gear.

Construction and numbering
The GCR built 21 locomotives at Gorton Works in three batches between 1911 and 1917. They ordered a fourth batch of ten from Gorton, but this was not built until after the 1923 Grouping, under which GCR became part of the newly formed London and North Eastern Railway (LNER). The LNER then ordered a fifth batch of 13 to a modified design, incorporating reduced boiler mountings and detail differences, and these were built by the outside contractors Hawthorn, Leslie & Co. during 1925–26 (works numbers 3616–28).

No. 5447 was withdrawn in 1942 because its frames were badly cracked. In 1943, the remaining engines were allocated new numbers in the 9800–42 block, but these were not applied until 1946. Forty-three locomotives passed to British Railways in 1948, and between 1948 and 1951 their numbers were increased by 60000. The class was divided into two parts in December 1948 as follows:
 A5/1, 69800-69829: Built at Gorton to Robinson's design
 A5/2, 69830-69842: Built by Hawthorn, Leslie with modifications by Gresley

None have been preserved.

Modelling
A 7 mm scale kit is available from MSC models.

In 2023, Sonic Models released a ready-to-run OO scale model in GCR, LNER, and BR variants.

References

Further reading
 Ian Allan ABC of British Railways Locomotives, 1948 edition, part 4, page 55.

External links 

 The Robinson A5 (GCR Class 9N) Pacific Tank Locomotives
 Class A5/1 Details at Rail UK
 Class A5/2 Details at Rail UK

09N
4-6-2T locomotives
Hawthorn Leslie and Company locomotives
Railway locomotives introduced in 1911
Scrapped locomotives
Standard gauge steam locomotives of Great Britain
2′C1′ h2t locomotives